Wonder Future is the eighth studio album by Japanese rock band Asian Kung-Fu Generation, released on May 27, 2015 through Sony Music subsidiary Ki/oon Music. The album is the first by the band to not feature art by artist Yusuke Nakamura.

Release 
The album was released on May 27, 2015 in Japan. The album was followed by two tours, one through Japan and one through Europe. The song "Easter" was released as a single earlier in the year. In addition, the song "Standard" was included on the band's Nano-Mugen Compilation 2014. The song "Planet of the Apes" was used as the theme song for the show Replay & Destroy.

Track listing

Personnel
Adapted from the album liner notes.

Asian Kung-Fu Generation
 Masafumi Gotoh – vocals, guitars
 Kiyoshi Ijichi – drums
 Kensuke Kita – guitars, vocals
 Takahiro Yamada – bass guitar, vocals

Additional musicians 
 Ryosuke Shimomura, Ai Iwasaki - vocals (track 8)

Production
 Masafumi Gotoh - producer
 Brian Gardner – mastering
 Nick Raskulinecz – mixing
 John Lousteau - track recording
 Kenichi Nakamura - vocal recording

Artwork and design
 Yutaka Kimura – design

Chart positions

References

2015 albums
Asian Kung-Fu Generation albums
Japanese-language albums
Sony Music albums